Ivan Vorobev (born 16 July 1988) is a Russian judoka. He won the bronze at the 2013 World Judo Championships in the category -81 kg.

References

External links
 

Living people
1988 births
Russian male judoka